The Suldental is a side valley of the Trafoi Valley in South Tyrol, Italy. The village in the valley is Sulden.

References
Alpenverein South Tyrol

External links

Valleys of South Tyrol